The Balanda Bviri are an ethnic group living in the South Sudanese states of Western Bahr el Ghazal and Western Equatoria. They number about 1, 350,000 and speak Bviri, one of the Ubangian languages.

The Balanda Bviri live in both Western Equatoria (Tambura, Nagero, Namatina, Mopoi, Yangiri, Nadiangere, Kobir Bawo) and Western Bahar El Ghazal (Bazia, Bagari and Dem Zubier). Their number is more than estimated 1,350,000, taking into consideration those in diaspora and South Sudan.

References

Ethnic groups in South Sudan